German submarine U-50 was a Type VIIB U-boat of Nazi Germany's Kriegsmarine during World War II. Ordered on 21 November 1936, she was laid down as yard number 585 at the yards of Friedrich Krupp Germaniawerft AG in Kiel on 3 November 1938. She was launched on 1 November 1939 and commissioned on 12 December 1939 by Kapitänleutnant (Kptlt.) Max-Hermann Bauer, who was the sole commander of the boat. In her short career she conducted only two patrols, both as part of the 7th U-boat Flotilla. In this time she succeeded in sinking four ships, totalling .

Design
German Type VIIB submarines were preceded by the shorter Type VIIA submarines. U-50 had a displacement of  when at the surface and  while submerged. She had two shafts and two  propellers.

U-50 was fitted with five  torpedo tubes (four fitted at the bow and one at the stern), fourteen torpedoes, one  SK C/35 naval gun, 220 rounds, and one  anti-aircraft gun The boat had a complement of between forty-four and sixty.

Service history

First patrol
Departing the German-administered island of Helgoland (sometimes known as Heligoland), on 6 February 1940, U-50 proceeded north of the British Isles. It was here that she sighted her first victim at 22.40 hours on 11 February. The neutral Swedish steam merchant ship Orania was homeward bound from Argentina with a load of maize, bran and oil cakes. Despite running fully illuminated, the U-Boat was unable to identify her as neutral but attacked with a single torpedo at 23.54 hours about 65 miles north-northeast of the Shetland Islands. All 24 souls aboard abandoned ship in two lifeboats, but one, with fourteen occupants, was never seen again.

In the early morning hours of 15 February, U-50 crossed paths with her second victim, the  Danish steam merchantman Maryland, which was travelling unescorted. The first torpedo, fired at 01.54 hours, detonated prematurely (a common problem early in the war). A second shot at 02.07 hours broke the ship's back and she sank in seven minutes. All 34 aboard perished; only a wrecked lifeboat was found later, at North Uist.

U-50 travelled south after this encounter and found her third victim, the neutral Dutch steam merchant ship Tara west of Cape Finisterre. Despite her neutral affiliation, she was travelling without neutrality markings (according to the U-Boat captain's log). The submarine had spotted her at midnight and attacked with a single torpedo at 01.38 hours, which missed. A second torpedo at 02.54 hours found its mark. All hands abandoned ship in two lifeboats as U-50 moved in to deliver the coup de grâce at 03.12 hours. The vessel sank twenty minutes later. One lifeboat made landfall on the Spanish coast. The other was picked up by the Spanish fishing trawler Milin; its occupants were landed at A Coruña.

At 00.20 hours on 22 February, U-50 located convoy OGF-19 and torpedoed the  British tanker British Endeavour about 100 miles west of Vigo. Five were killed in the attack, the remaining thirty-three (including the ship's master), abandoned ship and were picked up by the British merchantman Bodnant. The survivors were landed at Funchal in Portugal on 26 February.

The U-Boat terminated this successful patrol at Kiel on 4 March after 28 days at sea.

Second patrol
U-50s second and final patrol began 5 April 1940. She departed Kiel and was never heard from again.

Fate
U-50 ran afoul of a minefield and sank on 6 April in the North Sea north of Terschelling. Her exact position is not known. All 44 sailors were killed.

Summary of raiding history

References

Bibliography

External links

German Type VIIB submarines
U-boats commissioned in 1939
U-boats sunk by mines
U-boats sunk in 1940
World War II submarines of Germany
World War II shipwrecks in the North Sea
1939 ships
Ships built in Kiel
Ships lost with all hands
Maritime incidents in April 1940